Hexadecimal time is the representation of the time of day as a hexadecimal number in the interval [0, 1).

The day is divided into 1016 (1610) hexadecimal hours, each hour into 10016 (25610) hexadecimal minutes, and each minute into 1016 (1610) hexadecimal seconds.

History
This time format was proposed by the Swedish-American engineer John W. Nystrom in 1863 as part of his tonal system.

In 1997, the American Mark Vincent Rogers of Intuitor proposed a similar system of hexadecimal time and implemented it in JavaScript as the Hexclock.

Implementation
A day is unity, or 1, and any fraction thereof can be shown with digits to the right of the hexadecimal separator.  So the day begins at midnight with .0000 and one hexadecimal second after midnight is .0001.  Noon is .8000 (one half), one hexadecimal second before was .7FFF and one hexadecimal second before next midnight will be .FFFF.

Intuitor-hextime may also be formatted with an underscore separating hexadecimal hours, minutes and seconds. For example:

Clock

Conversions

See also
 Binary time
 Decimal time
 Metric time

References

Further reading

External links
 Hexadecimal Time Applet - digital and analog
 True Binary Time - local time as a binary number 
 Analog hexadecimal clock - Florence Mean Time

Time measurement systems
Hexadecimal numeral system
Clock designs